The Richard B. Ogilvie Transportation Center (formerly Chicago and North Western Terminal) is a commuter rail terminal in downtown Chicago, Illinois. It is the terminus for the three commuter rail lines of Metra's Union Pacific District to Chicago's northern and western suburbs, which approach the terminal elevated above street level.  It occupies the lower floors of the 500 West Madison Street building.  The building occupies two square city blocks, bounded by Randolph Street and Madison Street to the north and south and by Canal Street and Clinton Street to the east and west. It is the second busiest rail station in Chicago, after nearby Union Station, the sixth-busiest railway station in North America, and the third-busiest station (after Grand Central Terminal and Jamaica station) that exclusively serves commuter traffic.

History

The 1911 station
The Chicago and North Western Railway built the Chicago and North Western Terminal in 1911 to replace its Wells Street Station across the North Branch of the Chicago River. The new station, in the Renaissance Revival style, was designed by Frost and Granger, also the architects for the 1903 LaSalle Street Station.

The Tyler & Hippach Mirror Company Factory was moved 168 feet east and 52 feet south to make room for the station's construction. At the time, this was the largest building ever moved.

The station's 16 tracks were elevated above street level and "reached by six approach tracks and sheltered under an 894-foot-long [272 meter] Bush train shed." The upper level of the head house housed a concourse and other facilities for intercity passengers, including "dressing rooms, baths, nurses and matrons rooms, and a doctor's office". The centerpiece of the upper level was a stately waiting room, measuring 201 by 202 feet (34 by 62 meters), and rising 84 feet (approx. 26 meters) to its barrel vaulted ceiling. In addition to the main concourse on the upper level, there was a street-level concourse for commuters.

During the heyday of rail travel, the Chicago and North Western Terminal was home to the C&NW's trains to Milwaukee, Minneapolis-St Paul, Madison and other cities of the upper Midwest, including the railroad's premier 400 series of trains. Until October 30, 1955, it was also the Chicago terminus of the trains the Union Pacific ran in conjunction with the C&NW, including the Overland Limited and the famed City trains (City of San Francisco, City of Los Angeles, Portland Rose) (operations of all Union Pacific intercity passenger trains would be turned over to the C&NW's rival, the Milwaukee Road). Other less famous trains such as the Corn King Special (Omaha), Viking (Milwaukee, Green Bay, and Minneapolis/St Paul), and Columbine (Denver). In 1939, there were 38 inter-city departures each business day.

The 1984 station
In 1984, the head house was razed and replaced with the glass-and-steel 42-story Citicorp Center (now 500 West Madison), which was completed three years later in 1987. Metra service was maintained with only minor interruptions during construction – following the example of the demolition and replacement of New York Penn Station.

1991 rehabilitation

In 1991 Metra purchased the train shed from Chicago and North Western and conducted a survey to determine the condition. The examination included necessary repairs to improve its structural integrity and redesign measures to bring the station up to modern mass-commuting standards. After completing a thorough evaluation, Metra, the Urban Mass Transportation Administration, and the Illinois Department of Transportation decided to completely replace the existing structure and in 1992, with the assistance of Federal funding, a contractor and management team were selected to begin the work.

Many engineering challenges had to be addressed and resolved, not only because of the train shed's prominent location but also due to its high traffic volume as it was to remain operational to 45,000 daily commuters during the project.  Such challenges included the removal of original lead paint, the complete replacement of all 16 tracks which served 200 trains a day, extensive structural steel repairs (under load), erection of a new steel canopy, complete exterior masonry restoration, new electrical and plumbing systems, and construction of a new pedestrian concourse.  During the rehabilitation project, which lasted four years and cost $138 million, over 60 contractors spent more than 800,000 man-hours performing repairs and producing new construction.

The station was renamed the Ogilvie Transportation Center in 1997, two years after the C&NW merged into the Union Pacific Railroad. The station was named for Richard B. Ogilvie, a board member of the Milwaukee Road (the C&NW's rival and competing neighbor) and a lifelong railroad proponent, who, as governor of Illinois, created the Regional Transportation Authority, which is the parent agency of Metra. Many longtime Chicago-area residents still call it "North Western Station", and many longtime employees simply call it "CPT" – short for "Chicago Passenger Terminal".

Platforms and tracks

The station has 16 tracks with eight island platforms, each island platform servicing two tracks. Not all the platforms are the same length; the platforms on the western part of the station (tracks 1–10) are significantly longer than the eastern platforms. In general, West Line trains depart from the western platforms (roughly tracks 1–5), Northwest Line trains depart from the middle tracks (6–11), and North Line trains depart from the eastern tracks (12–16). This is done so that departing and arriving trains do not have to make large switch movements, which would block the use of other tracks and prevent multiple trains from arriving and departing at the same time. Just north of the station, the number of tracks reduces from 16 to six. Switches allow for trains on any of the 16 station tracks to end up on any of these six tracks, and vice versa. About a third of a mile from the station, the six tracks split into two mainlines of four tracks. One mainline turns west, while the other turns northwest. West Line trains take the west tracks, while Northwest and North Line trains take the northwest tracks.

Services

The Chicago and North Western Terminal has served as a terminal for all the commuter and intercity trains of the Chicago and North Western Railway. In addition, on November 9, 1969, the day after Grand Central Station closed, the Baltimore and Ohio Railroad and Pere Marquette Railway, Grand Central's two remaining users, moved their remaining intercity services into the C&NW's terminal. Those trains, which used the C&NW's branch to the St. Charles Air Line west of Western Avenue, last ran on April 30, 1971, the day before Amtrak took over most intercity passenger trains in the U.S. Amtrak services over the lines of those two railroads have run into Union Station.

Metra's three Union Pacific District lines – the Union Pacific/North Line, Union Pacific/Northwest Line and Union Pacific/West Line – now provide regular commuter rail service along three former C&NW lines.  In Metra's zone-based fare schedule, Ogilvie is in Zone A.  More than 106,000 people board Metra trains at Ogilvie Transportation Center each day.

Traffic statistics

Bus and 'L' connections
Bus connections can be made on Madison Street or Washington Boulevard via the Citigroup Center or through a lower level concourse accessible by the track platforms between Washington Boulevard and Randolph Street with entrances at Canal and Clinton Streets. Connections can also be made at the Union Station bus terminal via an entrance to Union Station's north concourse on Madison Street.

Ogilvie offers two connections to the Chicago Transit Authority's  "L" system. It is next door to Clinton station; Ogilvie's platforms directly abut Clinton. Ogilvie is three blocks west of Washington/Wells station.

CTA buses
 J14 Jeffery Jump
 19 United Center Express
 56 Milwaukee
 60 Blue Island/26th (Owl Service)
 120 Ogilvie/Streeterville Express
 124 Navy Pier
 125 Water Tower Express
 126 Jackson
 128 Soldier Field Express
 130 Museum Campus
 157 Streeterville/Taylor
 192 University of Chicago Hospitals Express

Major intercity trains before Amtrak

Chicago & North Western trains
 North Western Limited
Twin Cities 400
Flambeau 400
Minnesota 400 and its successors the Dakota 400 and Rochester 400
Kate Shelley 400

Union Pacific/Chicago and North Western trains
Overland Limited
Challengers
City of San Francisco
City of Los Angeles
City of Portland
City of Denver
Gold Coast

See also
List of busiest railway stations in North America
List of passenger railroads in Chicago for other passenger railroad terminals in downtown Chicago

References

Kevin P. Keefe, City of Six Stations, Trains July 2003, p. 69

External links

Main entrance (Madison Street) from Google Maps Street View
Washington Boulevard entrance from Google Maps Street View

Metra stations in Chicago
Chicago
Chicago
Clock towers in Illinois
Transit centers in the United States
Railway stations in the United States opened in 1984
1984 establishments in Illinois
Chicago Northwestern
Union Pacific North Line
Union Pacific West Line